The Men's team sprint competition at the 2020 UCI Track Cycling World Championships was held on 26 February 2020.

Results

Qualifying
The qualifying was started at 19:12. The best eight teams advance to the first round.

First round
The first round was started at 20:27.

First round heats were held as follows:
Heat 1: 4th v 5th fastest
Heat 2: 3rd v 6th fastest
Heat 3: 2nd v 7th fastest
Heat 4: 1st v 8th fastest

The heat winners were ranked on time, from which the top 2 advanced to the gold medal final and the other 2 proceeded to the bronze medal final.

 QG = qualified for gold medal final
 QB = qualified for bronze medal final

Finals
The finals were started at 21:22.

References

Men's team sprint
UCI Track Cycling World Championships – Men's team sprint